The Llandovery transmitting station is a telecommunications facility located to the north of Llandovery and east of Cynghordy, in Carmarthenshire, Wales. It has a self-supporting 40 m lattice mast erected on land that is itself about 312 m above sea level. The site was originally built by the IBA, entering service in 1968 transmitting the now-defunct 405-line VHF television system.  As well as providing an ITV service to the town of Llandovery some 8 km to the south west the site also transmitted to the north east, primarily to provide a link-signal for the ITV transmitter at Llandrindod Wells.  The north easterly transmission also provided the ITV service to the villages of Llanwrtyd Wells and Llangammarch Wells.

When UHF 625-line colour TV came to mid Wales in the 1970s the Llandovery locality was covered by the main transmitter at Carmel and so this site was not needed as a repeater. The villages of Llanwrtyd Wells and Llangammarch Wells were subsequently covered by a UHF relay station at Llanwrtyd Wells which came into service in the early 1980s. The nearest UHF relay to the Llandovery site is at Cilycwm 5.4 km to the west.

405-line television from Llandovery was shut down in January 1985.

Services listed by frequency

Analogue television

30 August 1968 - 3 January 1985
ITV 405-line television started up with the site acting as an off-air relay transmitter of Preseli about 65 km to the west.

3 January 1985 - present
405-line television was shut down across the UK in 1985 and Llandovery's Band III transmitter ended its service after a mere 17 years. From then onwards the site has been used as a telecommunications relay only.

See also
List of masts
List of tallest buildings and structures in Great Britain

References

External links
 MB21's page on BBC 405 TV to Wales and the West
 405 Alive's list of transmitters"
 More details on 405-line BBC transmitters

Buildings and structures in Powys
Transmitter sites in Wales